Flavisolibacter tropicus is a Gram-negative and non-motile bacterium from the genus of Flavisolibacter which has been isolated from soil from the tropical zone from Ecorium in Korea.

References

External links
Type strain of Flavisolibacter tropicus at BacDive -  the Bacterial Diversity Metadatabase

Chitinophagia
Bacteria described in 2016